The Campeonato Catarinense Série C  is the third tier of football league of the state of Santa Catarina, Brazil.

Participants
2022 edition

List of champions

Divisão de Acesso

Série C

Notes

Camboriuense is the currently Camboriú FC.
Cidade Azul is the currently Atlético Tubarão.

Titles by team 

Teams in bold still active.

By city

References

 
Catarinense